The 2017 Belarusian protests were a series of demonstrations and street protests against President Alexander Lukashenko that broke out in late February 2017. Protesters mobilized against a tax levied against the unemployed in Belarus. Demonstrations and marches were held in sites throughout the country with sizes of several hundred to several thousand gathering at a given time.

Context
Belarus has been described for several years as Europe's "last dictatorship" with no genuine political opposition against Lukashenko possible. Previous protests in 2011 and 2015 resulted in mass arrests. The country has also been in an economic recession since 2015 due to falling gasoline prices and that year a law was passed taxing the unemployed. Roughly 470,000 Belarusians are obliged to pay the tax but only about 10% have since it was issued.

Activities
Approximately 2,500 protesters filled the streets in Minsk on 17 February to protest a policy that required anyone who works for less than 183 days per year to pay US$250 for "lost taxes" to help fund welfare policies. This converts to approximately —a half-month's wages. The law has proven unpopular and has been mocked in the public as the "law against social parasites". On 19 February, another 2,000 demonstrated in the second city of Gomel. Both gatherings were unauthorized but were not disrupted by authorities. Smaller demonstrations were held in other cities.

On 25 March, opposition leader Vladimir Nekliayev, who was set to speak at the main protest, was stopped in the morning on his way to Minsk, his wife said.

The government defended the mass arrests and beatings against citizens by alleging that the police had found "petrol bombs and arms-laden cars" near a protest in Minsk.

Timeline of the events

19 February
Brest – a rally, about 100 protesters.
Gomel – procession (from 1,500 to 3,000 people)
Grodno – a few dozen people, march to the Municipal Administration
Vitebsk – 250 people
Mogilev – meeting, 200 people

26 February
Brest – a rally, about 300 participants.
Baranovichi – a rally, about 300 participants.
Babruysk – gathered about 1,500 protesters.

5 March
Brest – Rally and procession from 1,000 to 2,000 people.
The mayor of Brest met with the protesters.

10 March
Maladzyechna – a rally in the Central Square, speeches, the adoption of a resolution and the procession to the tax service. The number of people gathered from 500 to 1,000 people.

After the rally, the organizers received 15 days of arrest.

11 March
In Pinsk 350 to 400 people gathered in the square.

12 March
Brest – on the square came out 200 people 
Babruysk – about 700 protesters gathered at Pieramohi square. The rally was spontaneous, none of the opposition leaders were present.
Orsha - the number of people gathered exceeded 1,000 people. Before the rally, journalists were detained to check documents 
Rahachow - about 400 participants. People discussed the current government and whether there is an alternative to it, and complained about the lack of work.

15 March
Mogilev – More than 500 residents of Mogilev went to protest 
To the protesting crowd came member of parliament Ihar Marzaliuk, five people arrested 
Minsk – From the cinema "Kastryčnik" to Banhalor Square and Družby Narodaŭ Park passed 1.5 to 4.5 thousand people, chanting "Long Live Belarus!", "No to Decree No.3 – Lukashenka go away!"
About 40 people were detained in Minsk.
Grodno – The meeting began with 300 protesters. At the end of the protest on the square there were 1,000 protesters.

25 March

Minsk – Several thousand people went to protest

1 May
Minsk – 400 people came to a banned protest despite the jailing of Mikola Statkevich, opposition leader and main organizer of the event.

See also
2017 Romanian protests
2017 Russian protests
2020-2021 Belarusian protests
Euromaidan

References

Protests
Belarusian
Belarusian opposition
Protests in Belarus
Belarusian protests
Belarusian protests
Belarusian protests
Belarusian protests